Dichostates tabularis is a species of beetle in the family Cerambycidae. It was described by Kolbe in 1897.

Subspecies
 Dichostates tabularis kenyensis Adlbauer, 2015
 Dichostates tabularis tabularis Kolbe, 1897

References

Crossotini
Beetles described in 1897